Asma Badar is an Indian actress, born 11 January, in Bhopal to a Muslim family.

Career
Badar came into the limelight for the role of Naina in the daily soap Sasural Simar Ka on Colors TV. She was also in the TV series Lapataganj, Tujh Sang Preet, and Jodha Akbar. Appears in Kannada film Pungi Daasa. after that she did MTV show Big F  and Tujhse Hai Raabta on ZEE TV

References

1988 births
Living people
Indian television actresses